The year 1976 in science and technology involved some significant events, listed below.

Astronomy and space exploration
 March – Faber–Jackson relation presented by astronomers Sandra M. Faber and Robert Earl Jackson.
 June 18 – Gravity Probe A, a satellite-based experiment to test Albert Einstein's theory of general relativity, is launched.
 July 20 –  Viking program: The Viking 1 lander successfully lands on Mars.
 July 31 – NASA releases the famous 'Face on Mars' photograph, taken by Viking 1
 August 7 – Viking program: Viking 2 enters into orbit around Mars.
 August 22 – Luna program: Luna 24 successfully makes an unmanned landing on the Moon, the last for 37 years.
 September 3 – Viking program: The Viking 2 spacecraft lands at Utopia Planitia on Mars and takes the first close-up color photographs of the planet's surface.
 September 17 – Space Shuttle Enterprise rolled out.
 Universe, a public domain film produced by Lester Novros for NASA, is released.

Aviation
 January 21 – Concorde begins commercial flights.
 December 8 – First flight of production General Dynamics F-16 Fighting Falcon.

Chemistry
 May – Marion M. Bradford publishes the Bradford protein assay method.
 Oberlin, Endo and Koyama publish evidence of the creation of carbon nanotubes using a vapor-growth technique.

Computer science
 January – The Cray-1, the first commercially developed supercomputer, is released by Seymour Cray's Cray Research. Model 001 is installed at Los Alamos National Laboratory in the United States.
 March – Peter Chen's key paper on the entity–relationship model is published, having first been presented at a conference in September 1975.
 April 1 – Apple Computer Company is formed by Steve Jobs and Steve Wozniak in California and on April 11 they launch their first computer, the Apple I, for the U.S. hobbyist market.
 November 26 – Little-known company Microsoft is officially registered with the Office of the Secretary of State of New Mexico.
 December – Release of Electric Pencil (originated by Michael Shrayer), the first word processor for home computers.

Cryptography
 November – An asymmetric-key cryptosystem is published by Whitfield Diffie and Martin Hellman who disclose the  Diffie–Hellman key exchange method of public-key agreement for public-key cryptography.

History of science and technology
 October 3 – Opening of the Dibner Library of the History of Science and Technology at the Smithsonian Institution's National Museum of History and Technology in Washington, D.C.
 Jean Gimpel's The Medieval Machine is published.

Mathematics
 July 11 – Keuffel and Esser manufacture the last slide rule in the United States.
 Imre Lakatos' Proofs and Refutations: the Logic of Mathematical Discovery is published posthumously.
 The four color theorem is proved by Kenneth Appel and Wolfgang Haken, the first major theorem to be proved using a computer.
 Andrei Suslin and Daniel Quillen independently prove the Quillen–Suslin theorem ("Serre's conjecture") about the triviality of algebraic vector bundles on affine space.

Paleontology
 Fossil footprints of bipedal hominini from 3.6M years BP are found at Laetoli in Tanzania by Andrew Hill when visiting Mary Leakey.

Physiology, medicine and psychology
 July 27 – Delegates attending an American Legion convention at The Bellevue-Stratford Hotel in Philadelphia, US, begin falling ill with a form of pneumonia: this will eventually be recognised as the first outbreak of Legionnaires' disease and will end in the deaths of 29 attendees.
 August 26 – The Ebola virus first emerges in outbreaks of viral hemorrhagic fever in Yambuku, Zaire, followed by outbreaks in Sudan.
 October 1–December 16 – Program of mass vaccination in the United States against the 1976 swine flu outbreak, suspended due to public fears over side-effects.
 October 28 – British evolutionary biologist Richard Dawkins' book The Selfish Gene is published, introducing the term memetics.
 Dementia with Lewy bodies is first described by Japanese psychiatrist and neuropathologist Kenji Kosaka.
 The term Münchausen syndrome by proxy is first coined by John Money and June Faith Werlwas.
 Norman F. Dixon publishes On the Psychology of Military Incompetence.

Technology
 The first laser printer is introduced by IBM (the IBM 3800).

Awards
 Nobel Prizes
 Physics – Burton Richter, Samuel C. C. Ting
 Chemistry – William N. Lipscomb
 Medicine – Baruch S. Blumberg, Daniel Carleton Gajdusek
 Turing Award – Michael O. Rabin, Dana Scott

Births
 July 27 – Demis Hassabis, British artificial intelligence researcher.
 November 19 – Jack Dorsey, American web developer.

Deaths
 January 19 – Hidetsugu Yagi (b. 1886), Japanese electrical engineer.
 February 1
 Werner Heisenberg (b. 1901), German theoretical physicist.
 George Whipple (b. 1878), American pathologist, winner of the Nobel Prize in Physiology or Medicine in 1934.
 April 21 – Carl Benjamin Boyer (b. 1906), American historian of mathematics.
 May 31 – Jacques Monod (b. 1910), French biochemist, winner of the Nobel Prize in Physiology or Medicine in 1965.
 August 18 – Shintaro Uda (b. 1886), Japanese electrical engineer.
 October 5 – Lars Onsager (b. 1903), Norwegian American chemist.
 September 16 – Bertha Lutz (b. 1894), Brazilian herpetologist and women's rights campaigner.
 September 26 – Pál Turán (b. 1910), Hungarian mathematician.
 November 5 – Willi Hennig (b. 1913), German entomologist and pioneer of cladistics.

References

 
20th century in science
1970s in science